Gangster Exchange is a 2009 film written and directed by Dean Bajramovic. The film debuted at the Beverly Hills Film Festival on April 3, 2009, where it won the Audience Choice for Best Film.

Plot
Japanese yakuza team up with Bosnian mobsters to import a toilet made of pure heroin into New York City.

Cast
Christopher Russell as Marco 
Nobuya Shimamoto as Hiro 
Aaron Poole as Big Dave 
Sarain Boylan as Kendra 
Jasmin Geljo as Gogo Wolf 
Zeljko Kecojevic as Dragan Wolf 
Walter Alza as Sasha 
Steven P. Park as Ozaki 
Denis Akiyama as Takayama 
David Krae as Snowy
Daniel Park as Kitano

References

External links
 
 

2009 films
American crime thriller films
Canadian crime thriller films
English-language Canadian films
2009 action films
2000s crime thriller films
Films about organized crime in the United States
Films set in New York City
Films shot in Toronto
2000s English-language films
2000s American films
2000s Canadian films
Canadian gangster films